Powelliphanta traversi, known as Travers' land snail, is a species of large, carnivorous land snail, a terrestrial pulmonate gastropod mollusc in the family Rhytididae. This species is endemic to the North Island of New Zealand between Wellington and Lake Waikaremoana.

There are six subspecies, all of which are listed by the New Zealand Department of Conservation as threatened:
Powelliphanta traversi florida Powell, 1946 – Nationally Endangered
Powelliphanta traversi latizona Powell, 1949 – Nationally Endangered
Powelliphanta traversi koputaroa Powell, 1946 – Nationally Endangered
Powelliphanta traversi otakia Powell, 1946 – Nationally Critical
Powelliphanta traversi tararuaensis Powell, 1938 – Nationally Endangered
Powelliphanta traversi traversi Powell, 1930 – Nationally Endangered

The eggs are oval and seldom constant in dimensions 10 × 8.75 mm, 9.5 × 8.5 mm, 10 × 8 mm, 11 × 9 mm, 10.75 × 9 mm.

See also
List of non-marine molluscs of New Zealand

References

Powelliphanta
Gastropods of New Zealand
Gastropods described in 1930
Taxobox binomials not recognized by IUCN
Taxa named by Arthur William Baden Powell
Endemic fauna of New Zealand
Endemic molluscs of New Zealand